Heinz Pliska (born 23 October 1941) is a retired German footballer. He played in the Bundesliga for Schalke 04.

References

External links 
 

1941 births
Living people
German footballers
Association football midfielders
Bundesliga players
FC Schalke 04 players
Sportspeople from Gelsenkirchen
Footballers from North Rhine-Westphalia